Monica was a range-only tail warning radar for bombers, introduced by the RAF in  June 1942. Officially known as ARI 5664, it operated at frequencies of around 300 MHz (on the boundary between VHF and UHF). The system was also used by the US Army Air Forces, under the name AN/APS-13, and the nickname Archie.

History

Monica was developed at the Bomber Support Development Unit (BSDU) in Worcestershire. After the Luftwaffe became aware of Monica from a crashed bomber, German scientists developed a passive radar receiver, named Flensburg (FuG 227). From early 1944, FuG 227 was used by nightfighter crews to home in on Allied bombers using Monica. However, on the morning of 13 July 1944, a 7.Staffel/NJG 2-flown Junkers Ju 88 G-1 nightfighter equipped with Flensburg mistakenly landed at RAF Woodbridge. After examining the Flensburg equipment,  the RAF ordered Monica withdrawn from all Bomber Command aircraft.
An AN/APS-13 was used as a radar altimeter during the Atomic bombings of Hiroshima and Nagasaki by the 509th Composite Group, USAAF.

See also
 List of World War II electronic warfare equipment

References

External links

 Oral History of Defence Electronics
 Folded Dipole UHF Yagi antenna patent used on Little Boy

Further reading
Price, Alfred : Battle Over the Reich (1973) 
Forczyk, Robert: Bf 110 vs Lancaster 1942-1945 (2013) 

Aircraft radars
World War II radars
World War II British electronics
Military radars of the United Kingdom
Military equipment introduced from 1940 to 1944